James Brenan (1837 – 7 August 1907) was an Irish artist.

Life 
Brenan was born in 1837 in Dublin. He was schooled at Strong's school, Peter Street and then in Dr Stuarts in Temple Street. He then commenced his art training at the Royal Dublin Society school of design. He travelled to London at the age of fourteen to pursue decorative arts.

Career
Brenan was among the most popular painters of nineteenth-century Ireland. He travelled to London where he studied decorative arts under Ownen Jones and Matthew Digby Wyatt. Between the periods of 1855 to 1860, Brenan trained in England, first at the Art Teacher Training School, Marlborough House, London. After his time spent at Marlborough, he travelled to an Art school in Birmingham, since he enjoyed the training school, Brenan move back there one year later. In 1853 when he won the prize medal for the department of science and arts.

He became headmaster of the Cork School of Art in 1860 and began working with the Royal Hibernian Academy a year later. Brenan was appointed headmaster of the Dublin Metropolitan School of Art in 1889. Among those he taught were Henry Jones Thaddeus and William Orpen. Brenan also introduced design classes to develop and advance the lace-making industry and other crafts.

Following his retirement as headmaster, George Tindall Plunkett stated that Brenan would "always be remembered for the great success which he had achieved and the very high place which the school had attained under his care among the art schools of the United Kingdom".

Legacy 
It is said that the preliminary classes of lace making and courses for lace design established by Brenan at the Crawford Municipal School of Art, led to the national awareness of lace making from 1886 to 1914, "It was not until the promotional works of James Brenan in Cork and Dublin that design for lace became significant". His continuous promotion was the reason how "the new crafts were introduced in Dublin in the early years of the twentieth century".

In 2009 his 'Morning Prayer, Cottage Interior, County Cork, 1901' was sold for 9,500.

External links
Brenan at Arts Edge Ireland

References

1808 births
1895 deaths
19th-century Irish painters
20th-century Irish painters
Irish male painters
Painters from Dublin (city)
19th-century Irish male artists
20th-century Irish male artists